, there have been two Formula One drivers from India. Indian Formula One drivers have had a race entry to 59 Grands Prix. Across these Grands Prix, Indian Formula One drivers have accumulated 5 points between them. No Indian driver has taken a race win, podium, fastest lap or pole position.

Narain Karthikeyan made his debut in  driving for Jordan. He would score 5 points at that year's .

Former drivers 
India's first Formula One driver was Narain Karthikeyan. Karthikeyan made his debut in  driving for Jordan. He ended the season with 5 points, having come 4th at the United States Grand Prix. Besides this, Karthikeyan's best result was eleventh. Karthikeyan was dropped after Jordan was sold to Midland. Karthikeyan took a race seat with HRT for the  season. He was replaced after 7 rounds by Daniel Ricciardo. He later made a one-off return at the 2011 Indian Grand Prix, replacing Vitantonio Liuzzi. He drove for HRT again in the  season, this time partnering with Pedro de la Rosa. Kartikeyan struggled against his teammate, failing to beat him throughout the season's races. He lost his race seat after HRT folded at the end of the year.

India's second Formula One driver was Karun Chandhok. Chandhok was signed by HRT for the  season. He would participate in 10 of the 19 rounds before Sakon Yamamoto took his car. Chandhok left Formula One at the end of 2011.

Timeline

References

External links